{{Speciesbox
| image = Collection d'orchidées (Pl. 13) (8385762675).jpg
| image_caption = Laelia elegans var. alba in Collection d'orchidées [art original] :aquarelles originales.
| genus = Cattleya
| species = × elegans
| authority = C.Morren, 1848
| synonyms = Many, including:
 Bletia × elegans (C.Morren) Rchb.f.
 Bletia × elegans var. houtteana (Rchb.f.) Rchb.f.
 Brasicattleya elegans (C.Morren) Campacci
 Cattleya elegans C.Morren
 Cattleya × devonia auct.
 Cattleya × devoniensis (Rchb.f.) T.Moore
 Hadrocattleya elegans (C.Morren) V.P.Castro & Chiron
 Hadrocattleya elegans f. leucotata (L.Linden) F.Barros & J.A.N.Bat.
 Laelia × brysiana Lem. 
 Laelia × devoniensis Rchb.f.
 Laelia elegans Rchb. f.
 Laelia × elegans (C.Morren) Rchb.f.
 Laelia × elegans var. alba Barb.Rodr.
 Laelia × elegans var. blenheimensis B.S.Williams
 Laelia × elegans var. gigantea (R.Warner) A.H.Kent
 Laelia × elegans var. houtteana Rchb.f.
 Laelia × elegans var. incantans Rchb.f.
 Laelia × elegans var. morreniana Rchb.f.
 Laelia × elegans var. picta Rchb.f.
 Laelia × elegans var. schilleriana A.H.Kent
 Laelia × elegans var. tautziana Rchb.f.
 Laelia × elegans var. turneri (R.Warner) A.H.Kent
 Laelia × gigantea R.Warner
 Laelia × pachystele Rchb.f.
 Laelia × turneri R.Warner
 × Laeliocattleya elegans (C.Morren) Rolfe
 × Laeliocattleya elegans var. leucotata L.Linden
 Laeliocattleya pachystele (Rchb.f.) Rchb.f.
 Laeliocattleya sayana Linden
 Laeliocattleya schulziana Linden
 × Sophrocattleya elegans (C.Morren) Van den Berg & M.W.Chase
}}Cattleya × elegans is a hybrid orchid in the subtribe Laeliinae. It is a pseudobulb epiphyte. Its formula hybridae is  Cattleya purpurata (Lindl. & Paxton) Van den Berg (2008) × Cattleya tigrina'' A.Rich. (1848). It is found in South and South-East Brazil.

References

External links
 
 
 
 Cattleya × elegans at the World Checklist of selected plant families
 Cattleya × elegans at Tropicos
 Cattleya × elegans at International Plant Name Index (IPNI)

Plants described in 1848
elegans
Orchids of Brazil
Interspecific orchid hybrids